Slovenia participated in the Eurovision Song Contest 2008 with the song "Vrag naj vzame" written by Josip Miani-Pipi and Igor Amon Mazul. The song was performed by Rebeka Dremelj. Slovenian broadcaster Radiotelevizija Slovenija (RTV Slovenija) organised the national final EMA 2008 in order to select the Slovenian entry for the 2008 contest in Belgrade, Serbia. The national final consisted of two semi-finals and a final where the winner was selected over two rounds of public voting. The top two entries in the first round competed in the second round where "Vrag naj vzame" performed by Rebeka Dremelj was eventually selected as the winner.

Slovenia was drawn to compete in the first semi-final of the Eurovision Song Contest which took place on 20 May 2008. Performing during the show in position 8, "Vrag naj vzame" was not announced among the 10 qualifying entries of the first semi-final and therefore did not qualify to compete in the final. It was later revealed that Slovenia placed eleventh out of the 19 participating countries in the semi-final with 36 points.

Background 

Slovenia's highest placing in the contest, to this point, has been seventh place, which the nation achieved on two occasions: in 1995 with the song "Prisluhni mi" performed by Darja Švajger and in 2001 with the song "Energy" performed by Nuša Derenda. The country's only other top ten result was achieved in 1997 when Tanja Ribič performing "Zbudi se" placed tenth. Since the introduction of semi-finals to the format of the contest in 2004, Slovenia had thus far only managed to qualify to the final on one occasion. In 2007, "Cvet z juga" performed by Alenka Gotar qualified to the final and placed fifteenth.

The Slovenian national broadcaster, Radiotelevizija Slovenija (RTV Slovenija), broadcasts the event within Slovenia and organises the selection process for the nation's entry. RTV Slovenija confirmed Slovenia's participation in the 2008 Eurovision Song Contest on 10 October 2007. The Slovenian entry for the Eurovision Song Contest has traditionally been selected through a national final entitled Evrovizijska Melodija (EMA), which has been produced with variable formats. For 2008, the broadcaster opted to organise EMA 2008 to select the Slovenian entry.

Before Eurovision

EMA 2008 
EMA 2008 was the 13th edition of the Slovenian national final format Evrovizijska Melodija (EMA). The competition was used by RTV Slovenija to select Slovenia's entry for the Eurovision Song Contest 2008. The 2008 edition of EMA took place at the RTV Slovenija Studio 1 in Ljubljana and consisted of three shows: two semi-finals and a final. The competition was broadcast on TV SLO1 and online via the broadcaster's website rtvslo.si.

Format 
Twenty songs competed in three televised shows consisting of two semi-finals on 1 and 2 February 2008 and a final on 3 February 2008. Ten songs competed in each semi-final with public televoting exclusively selecting five finalists out of the ten songs to proceed to the final. In the final, the winner was selected over two rounds of public televoting. In the first round, two out of the ten competing songs were selected to proceed to a superfinal. In the superfinal, the winner was determined.

Competing entries 
Artists and composers were able to submit their entries to the broadcaster between 10 October 2007 and 30 November 2007. Over 200 entries were received by the broadcaster during the submission period. An expert committee consisting of Elza Budau (lyricist), Andrej Šifrer (singer and composer), Vojko Sfiligoj (musician and composer), Samo Koler (public representative) and Igor Pirkovič (RTVSLO Eurovision project manager) selected twenty artists and songs for the competition from the received submissions. The competing artists were announced on 11 December 2007. Petre Pečovnik with the song "Extrem" and Skupina Zaka' pa ne with the song "Eo eo" were later disqualified from the competition and were replaced by Brigita Šuler with the song "Samara" and Cole in predsednik with the song "Dober planet".

Semi-finals 
Two semi-finals took place on 1 and 2 February 2008. Semi-final 1 was hosted by Lorella Flego and Peter Poles and semi-final 2 was hosted by Tjaša Hrobat and Jure Sešek. Ten entries competed in each semi-final and a public vote selected five entries to proceed to the final.

In addition to the performances of the competing entries, LeeLooJamais, Aleksandra Kovač and Neisha performed as guests in semi-final 1, and Trkaj, Alya, 6pack Čukur and 1996 Slovenian Eurovision entrants Regina performed as guests in semi-final 2.

Final 
The final of EMA 2008 took place on 3 February 2008, hosted by Bernarda Žarn and Mario Galunič. The winner was selected over two rounds of public voting. In the first round, the top two entries were selected to proceed to the second round: "Za svobodo divjega srca" performed by Skupina Langa and "Vrag naj vzame" performed by Rebeka Dremelj. In the second round, "Vrag naj vzame" performed by Rebeka Dremelj was selected as the winner.

In addition to the performances of the competing entries, 1995 and 1999 Slovenian Eurovision entrant Darja Švajger, 2001 Slovenian Eurovision entrant Nuša Derenda, 2007 Slovenian Eurovision entrant Alenka Gotar and Helena Blagne performed as guests.

At Eurovision
It was announced in September 2007 that the competition's format would be expanded to two semi-finals in 2008. According to the rules, all nations with the exceptions of the host country and the "Big Four" (France, Germany, Spain and the United Kingdom) are required to qualify from one of two semi-finals in order to compete for the final; the top nine songs from each semi-final as determined by televoting progress to the final, and a tenth was determined by back-up juries. The European Broadcasting Union (EBU) split up the competing countries into six different pots based on voting patterns from previous contests, with countries with favourable voting histories put into the same pot. On 28 January 2008, a special allocation draw was held which placed each country into one of the two semi-finals. Slovenia was placed into the first semi-final, to be held on 20 May 2008. The running order for the semi-finals was decided through another draw on 17 March 2008 and Slovenia was set to perform in position 8, following the entry from Azerbaijan and before the entry from Norway.

In Slovenia, the semi-finals and the final were televised on RTV Slovenija with commentary by Andrej Hofer. The Slovenian spokesperson, who announced the Slovenian votes during the final, was Peter Poles.

Semi-final 

Rebeka Dremelj took in technical rehearsals on 11 and 15 May, followed by dress rehearsals on 19 and 20 May. The Slovenian performance featured Dremelj emerging from a green-lit cage and performing in a cape, which was later removed to reveal a green-blue dress, together with two dancers in black latex and helmets. During the performance, Dremelj revealed a leash on her dancers which she took them with. The stage costumes for the performance were designed by Slovenian designer Urša Drofenik. Dremelj was joined by three on-stage backing vocalists: Jelena Majić, Marina Durović and Sandra Feketija. The two dancers that joined Dremelj on stage were Matej Bedič and Željko Božič, with the latter also choreographed the Slovenian performance.

At the end of the show, Slovenia was not announced among the ten qualifying entries in the first semi-final and therefore failed to qualify to compete in the final. It was later revealed that Slovenia placed eleventh in the semi-final, receiving a total of 36 points.

Voting 
Below is a breakdown of points awarded to Slovenia and awarded by Slovenia in the first semi-final and grand final of the contest. The nation awarded its 12 points to Bosnia and Herzegovina in the semi-final and to Serbia in the final of the contest.

Points awarded to Slovenia

Points awarded by Slovenia

References

2008
Countries in the Eurovision Song Contest 2008
Eurovision